Parkdale Plaza was a shopping mall located in Corpus Christi, Texas, United States. It opened in 1957 and closed in 2010 to be torn down for a Walmart.

1960s
The original three major stores at Parkdale Plaza were JCPenney, Whites Stores, and H-E-B. Other major tenants included Western Auto, Piccadilly Cafeterias, Larry Robinson (a Corpus Christi photography studio), and the Toy House, as well as Neisner's five and dime. When H-E-B moved, Texas Gold Stamp center also owned by H-E-B took its place as an anchor store. JCPenney moved to Padre Staples Mall (now La Palmera) in 1970. A Woolco store was later added to the plaza.

By 1982, Parkdale Plaza had lost Lichensteins', Whites, H-E-B, and Woolco. Linens N' More took over the Old H-E-B location, and Decorator's Gallery took over the Whites Stores located in the back. Western Auto also left the Plaza during this time, though it was replaced by Autozone. During this time,  free-standing Eckerd's and Wendy's locations were added to the Plaza

Sutherland's Home Improvement took over the former Woolco store around the late 1980s to early 1990s, and Weiner's moved into the former JCPenney. Cloth World was bought out by Jo-Ann Stores and closed in 1994. Decorator's Gallery was shut down in 1994 as well. The Decorator's Gallery building remained empty throughout the 1990s. Club Dallas took over the back side of the Plaza. In 1995, Parkdale Plaza had about 65% leased. Dollar General came to the Plaza in 1999.

Entering 2000, the Plaza had no more than 45% of spaces being leased. Weiner's Department Store filed for bankruptcy in 1999 and caused the Parkdale Plaza store to shutter in June 2001. Rehoboth Joy Dollar took over vacant old Weiners Store in 2001. Eckerds sold to CVS pharmacy and closed the Parkdale Plaza location, which became Guitar Center in 2002.

Purchase in 2005

In 2005, an investor from Austin bought Parkdale Plaza. On January 1, 2006, Crystal's, Joy Dollar, Linens N' More, RDA, and Armstrong McCall closed their store locations in accordance with the purchase agreement. The buyer had a vision to redevelop the Plaza into a newer shopping center. Parkdale Plaza was ready for a change. In 2009, the plaza's vacant areas suffered from a mild fire. The fire caused extensive damage to the vacant stores. The stores now could not be re-leased until new buildings were built. The largely vacant shopping center became covered in graffiti and choked with overgrown grass.

Parkdale Shopping Center was demolished in 2010. The City Council okayed tax incentives for the prospective redevelopment based on plans to build a new Walmart Supercenter and create a shopping strip to lease out to retailers.   These plans were delayed by a lawsuit brought by neighboring Sutherlands and protests over another proposed Walmart store on the city's south side.  Though scheduled for completion in 2010, the store was not completed until Fall 2011 and opened on October 26, 2011.

References

External links
Quick Co Website
Walmart Update 2009
Crystal's Confectionery Closes
Walmart Plans Unravel

Buildings and structures in Corpus Christi, Texas
Shopping malls established in 1957
Shopping malls in Texas